Tianjin R&F Guangdong Tower is a 91 storey,  tall mixed use supertall skyscraper on hold in Tanggu District, Tianjin, China. The tower was proposed for construction in 2008. Since then, construction progress has substantially slowed and later halted. If completed it will become the third tallest building in Tianjin and one of the tallest buildings in the world.

See also

 List of tallest buildings in China
 List of tallest buildings in the world

References

External links
 Tianjin R&F Guangdong Tower page at CTBUH
 Tianjin R&F Guangdong Tower page at Emporis

Buildings and structures under construction in China
Skyscraper office buildings in Tianjin
Residential skyscrapers in China
Skyscraper hotels in Tianjin
Skyscrapers in Tianjin